Jorma Salmi (6 May 1933 – 24 May 2016) was a Finnish professional ice hockey player. He played in the SM-sarja for Ilves, HIFK, and HJK and also played in Sweden's Division 1 for AIK IF and Västra Frölunda IF. He was inducted into the Finnish Hockey Hall of Fame in 2003. He was a member of the 1960 Finnish Olympic team. He moved to the United States and was residing in the Chicago suburb of Buffalo Grove, Illinois.

External links
 Finnish Hockey Hall of Fame bio
 

1933 births
2016 deaths
People from Kotka
AIK IF players
Finnish ice hockey forwards
Frölunda HC players
HIFK (ice hockey) players
Ilves players
Finnish expatriates in the United States
Ice hockey players at the 1960 Winter Olympics
Olympic ice hockey players of Finland
Sportspeople from Kymenlaakso